Mike Strobel (born  1955) is a Canadian journalist, formerly a columnist for the Toronto Sun.
After attending the School of Journalism at Carleton University Strobel joined the Calgary Sun in 1980. He moved to the Toronto Sun where he became managing editor in 1989 and subsequently its editor-in-chief in 1999 until 2001 at which time he resigned. Strobel continued with the Sun as a featured columnist.

Bibliography

Awards
 Mike Strobel was voted Top Journalist of Toronto in the Top Choice Awards survey in 2012 and 2013.

References

External links
 Mike Strobel at the Toronto Sun

Living people
1950s births
Canadian columnists
Canadian newspaper editors
Canadian male journalists
Carleton University alumni
Date of birth missing (living people)
Toronto Sun editors